Nikolay Maximovich Tsiskaridze PAR (Nik'oloz Cisk'aridze) is a Georgian-Russian ballet dancer who had been a member of the Bolshoi Ballet for 21 years (1992–2013).

Biography

Early years 

Nikolay Tsiskaridze was born in Tbilisi, Soviet Georgia in 1973. He was the first-born child of Lamara Nikolayevna Tsiskaridze, who was 42 years old at the time and grew up without knowing his father. His mother was a physicist, and she worked at Obninsk Nuclear Power Plant, then as a teacher at Tbilisi public school №162. Five years after his mother's death an aunt revealed Tsiskaridze's father was a brother of their neighbor, a violinist, who lived next door for almost 20 years, a fact he was unaware of.

Career in Ballet 

Tsiskaridze began his dance studies at the Tbilisi Ballet School in 1984. His mother supported his pursuit of ballet career, and she saved money to take him to Moscow to auditions. In 1987, he joined the Moscow Ballet School and studied under the guidance of Pyotr Pestov. After graduating in 1992, Tsiskaridze joined the ballet company of the Bolshoi Theatre, then under the direction of Yury Grigorovich. In Bolshoi, Tsiskaridze was coached by Galina Ulanova and Marina Semyonova. He was promoted to the position of principal dancer in 1995. Since then, Tsiskaridze has performed internationally with a number of ballet companies across the world, including the Mariinsky Ballet and Paris Opera Ballet. He also participated in most of the foreign tours of the Bolshoi Ballet, "Kings of the Dance" international project, Les Saisons Russes du XXI Siecle.

Over the course of his dance career, he performed over seventy roles in major classical works as well as ballets by renowned modern choreographers. While dancing, Tsiskaridze studied at the Pedagogical faculty of the Institute of Choreography in 1996. Since 2003, he has taught a daily ballet class at the Bolshoi Theatre, and began also teaching at the Moscow Ballet Academy in 2004. 

In October 2003, Tsiskaridze faced a major injury which threatened to end his career. During the rehearsal at Opera de Paris he tore the cruciate ligament. An operation on the knee was followed by a major staphylococci infection. After 9 more operations, he achieved complete recovery and returned to the stage after a nine-month intermission.

As a dancer, Tsiskaridze possessed the purity of Russian dance training and the regality and mystery of royalty. His extremely long legs moved with masculine power, yet also with feminine grace. His arms could at one moment be strong and forceful, and at the next soft and elegant. His feet were well arched for a man and his beats were pristine. As a product of the Russian ballet school, which emphasizes dramatic expression hand in hand with technique from a very early stage in training, Tsiskaridze was an effortless actor with the ability to mesmerize the audience. There were no small parts for Tsiskaridze where his profession was concerned. Preparation for any role was very important for him. The dancer says, "It is desirable to know everything about the ballet, about the character, the composer, the choreographer – everything."  There is a huge collection of videos and books about ballet in his house and some ballet critics envy his knowledge of this art. He doesn't get tired of studying and researching something new in the subjects that have already been well explored by him.

As Tsiskaridze says: "I believe that the fate of a person depends on his or her temper. If I had been more mild and base person, I would have become a worshipped hero! I was to have been on the cushion long ago! But disliking stupidity and imbecility, I don't manage to keep my mouth shut. Moreover, I don't care for it and feel good. All that I achieved in my life was achieved by my talent and industry. Ballet is a rough labor, all are working hard, but results differ. I had more luck because of my parents' genes."

Being a ballet dancer, Tsiskaridze has become a real superstar in Russia, having appeared in many reality shows and being a judge on Russia's version of Dancing with the Stars for several years.

Awards 
Tsiskaridze has received many awards and accolades: he became the youngest person to be named a People's Artist of Russia (2001). He received “Soul of the Dance” prize (1994), the State Prize of the Russian Federation (2001, 2003), the Prix Benois de la Danse (1999), Silver medal at the Osaka Ballet Competition (1995), Golden medal at the Moscow Ballet Competition (1997), Honoured Artist of Russia (1997), Russian Golden Mask theatrical prize (1998, 2000, 2003), Order of Honour of the Republic of Georgia (2003), Danza&Danza award as best dancer of the year 2003, Triumph prize (2004), Chevalier de l'Ordre des Arts et des Lettres de la République Française (2006), People's Artist of North Osetia — Alania Republic (2013) etc.

Assault Scandal 

In 2011, Tsiskaridze was a contender for directorship in Bolshoi, but Sergei Filin was chosen to the post. On 30 June 2013, Tsiskaridze left the Bolshoi when his contracts (as a premier dancer and as a ballet teacher) expired and the management decided not to extend them. His relationship with the directors of the theatre had become tense long ago. Tsiskaridze openly criticized the theatre's management for soiling the Bolshoi's repertoire of classics with contemporary works from abroad, for favoritism and bad taste. As a result of his criticism, Tsiskaridze and his students were denied roles, docked pay and prevented from advancing their careers. Tsiskaridze openly criticized the management for a six-year £800m-plus renovation of the theatre that turned out to be of a very low quality and raised serious concerns on theft, corruption and incompetence.

In January 2013, the acting artistic director of the Bolshoi Ballet Sergei Filin was assaulted, sulphuric acid was thrown into his face. Tsiskaridze was one of the suspects, but he had a strong alibi on the day of the assault. Though the former soloist of Bolshoi Pavel Dmitrichenko confessed to pay for the assault, many believed his confession was forced, and someone staged the whole attack to ruin Tsiskaridze's reputation and get him away from the theatre.

Public Positions 

In July 2011, Tsiskaridze was appointed a member of the President's Council for Culture and Arts.

In October 2013, Tsiskaridze was appointed a director of the prestigious Vaganova Academy of Russian Ballet in Saint Petersburg (est. in 1738) by order of the Culture Minister. In a year he was promoted to the full Rector of the institution.

In 2014, Tsiskaridze graduated as a Master of Law at Kutafin Moscow State Law University.

On 29 November, 2014, Tsiskaridze was formally confirmed as a Rector of the Vaganova Academy in unopposed election, winning 227 of the 244 possible votes which include professors, students and even school canteen workers. Even though his appointment a year earlier caused a scandal, Tsiskaridze  won the support of the staff with his hard work and significant results - improving the quality of education at the Academy, raising the funds for the school equipment and furnishing, negotiating various collaborations with other well-known schools and theatres, bringing the new repertoire broadening the range of opportunities for graduates.

In March 2014, he signed a letter in support of the position of the President of Russia Vladimir Putin on Russia's military intervention in Ukraine.

The trustees of Tokyo Ballet Academy have granted to Nikolay Tsiskaridze the status of professor emeritus. The artistic director of Tokyo Ballet Academy, Dr. Etsuro Satomi, signed the letter about it on February 11, 2015.

Repertoire 
Tsiskaridze danced in more than 70 ballets, including:

 Nutcracker Suite : Prince, Poupée Française
 La Belle au bois dormant : Prince Désiré, l'Oiseau Bleu, Fée Carabosse, Prince Fortune
 Romeo and Juliet : Mercutio, a troubadour
 La Sylphide : James
 Swan Lake : Prince Siegfried, Rothbart, the King
 La Bayadere : Solor, Bronze Idol
 The Legend of Love : Ferkhad
 Giselle : Albrecht
 The Spectre of the Rose : Le Spectre
 Raymonda : Jean de Brienne
 La Fille du pharaon : Taor
 La Dame de pique : Hermann
 Notre-Dame de Paris : Quasimodo
 Le Clair Ruisseau : Danseur classique
 A Midsummer Night's Dream : Theseus
 Le Corsaire : Conrad
La Rose Malade

References

External links 
Page on the Bolshoi Theater official website
Profile on Mariinsky Theatre website
Photographs with Ulanova, Grigorovich and Roland Petit
A propos de...  Tsiskaridze
Informal site
Photo Tsiskaridze's in "Photo gallery of masters of musical theatre"

Male ballet dancers from Georgia (country)
People's Artists of Russia
1973 births
Male dancers from Tbilisi
Living people
Prix Benois de la Danse winners
Chevaliers of the Ordre des Arts et des Lettres
Bolshoi Ballet principal dancers
Russian people of Georgian descent